Shahuraj Birajdar (born 19 July 1963) is a retired Indian boxer. He competed in the men's bantamweight event at the 1988 Summer Olympics.

References

External links
 

1963 births
Living people
Indian male boxers
Olympic boxers of India
Boxers at the 1988 Summer Olympics
Place of birth missing (living people)
Asian Games medalists in boxing
Boxers at the 1986 Asian Games
Asian Games silver medalists for India
Medalists at the 1986 Asian Games
Bantamweight boxers